Tomorrow Sunny / The Revelry, Spp is an album by American jazz saxophonist Henry Threadgill with his band Zooid, featuring Jose Davila on trombone and tuba, Liberty Ellman on guitar, Stomu Takeishi on bass guitar, Elliot Humberto Kavee on drums, and new member Christopher Hoffman on cello, who joined the group making it a sextet. It was recorded in 2011 and released on Pi Recordings.

Reception

The Down Beat review by John Corbett states, "With this incarnation of Zooid, Threadgill has yet again found the ideal vehicle for his evolving ideas."

The All About Jazz review by Troy Collins says, "Bolstered by the unswerving dedication of his longstanding sidemen, Tomorrow Sunny / The Revelry, Spp continues the ongoing documentation of Threadgill's Zooid, a consistently fascinating endeavor from one of the most compelling composers of our time."

In a review for PopMatters, John Garratt notes, "Tomorrow Sunny/The Revlery, Spp is the sound of Zooid branching out and out some more. They’re becoming more somber and melodic, more edgy and chaotic, softer and louder, seemingly all at once."

The JazzTimes review by Mike Shanley states, "Everything has a strong sense of direction, even during moments when things sound spare and minimal. As a result, the album comes off as the most focused Zooid release yet."

Track listing
All Compositions by Henry Threadgill
 "A Day Off" – 5:50
 "Tomorrow Sunny" – 6:30 
 "So Pleased, No Clue" – 3:34
 "See the Blackbird Now" – 9:27
 "Ambient Pressure Thereby" – 10:34
 "Put On Keep / Frontispiece, Spp" – 6:25

Personnel
 Henry Threadgill – flute, bass flute, alto saxophone
 Liberty Ellman – guitar
 Jose Davila – trombone, tuba 
 Christopher Hoffman – cello
 Stomu Takeishi – bass guitar
 Elliot Humberto Kavee – drums

References

2012 albums
Henry Threadgill albums
Pi Recordings albums